Georges Edy Laraque (born December 7, 1976) is a Canadian sports commentator, politician, and former ice hockey player. Laraque retired from hockey in 2010 after the Montreal Canadiens bought out his contract. He is a commentator for TVA Sports and most recently executive director of the fledgling Canadian Hockey League Players' Association.  During his 14-year National Hockey League (NHL) career, he played for the Edmonton Oilers, Phoenix Coyotes, Pittsburgh Penguins, and Montreal Canadiens. From 2010 to 2013, he was one of two deputy leaders of the Green Party of Canada.

Playing career 

Laraque entered the Quebec Major Junior Hockey League (QMJHL), where he played for a variety of teams. In 173 games at the junior level, Laraque stockpiled 107 points and 661 penalty minutes. Laraque was a member of the 1996 Granby Prédateurs team which won the Memorial Cup.

After finishing junior, Laraque spent parts of two seasons with the American Hockey League's (AHL) Hamilton Bulldogs. On October 25, 1996, Laraque was involved in his first professional fight taking on Chris LiPuma of the Kentucky Thoroughblades.

On September 15, 1997 in a pre-season game, Laraque fought established heavyweight fighter Donald Brashear of the Vancouver Canucks in an attempt to impress the coaching staff. On November 15, 1997, Laraque was called up to the NHL and took part in his first career fight against Todd Simpson of the Calgary Flames. Laraque won the fight and would be victorious in four others before being reassigned to the AHL.

A year later, with much hard work to improve his game, Laraque showed enough at the AHL-level for Edmonton to bring him to the NHL on a regular basis. Although he was something of a power forward in junior hockey, Laraque is considered primarily as an enforcer at the NHL level. His 273-pound body and his habit of fighting made him one of the most feared forwards in the league. He was unanimously awarded the 'Best Fighter' award from The Hockey News in 2003. He was named the number one enforcer by Sports Illustrated in 2008. Despite his reputation as a fighting-only player, Laraque has had offensive bursts during his career and on February 21, 2000, Laraque scored a hat trick against the Los Angeles Kings and was also named the game's first star.

During the 2004–2005 NHL lockout, he played in Sweden, signing on with AIK. The following season with the Oilers, on November 23, 2005 in a game against the Minnesota Wild, Laraque defeated the 6'7" 260 pound Derek Boogaard. In the 2006 off-season, Laraque was up for free agency and wanted to stay in Edmonton and play. He even said he was willing to take a salary cut if the Oilers accepted on giving him a long-term, no-trade clause deal. The Oilers did not agree with Laraque's demand for a no-trade clause thus the contract was never signed. On July 5, 2006, Laraque  signed with the Phoenix Coyotes. He scored his first goal as a Coyote against Edmonton on October 26, 2006. Laraque was then traded to the Pittsburgh Penguins for the 2007–08 season for agitating prospect Daniel Carcillo. Laraque's former junior coach and Penguins coach at the time Michel Therrien was heavily involved in this decision and believed that he was needed to protect the young stars in Sidney Crosby and Evgeni Malkin.

On July 3, 2008, Laraque signed a contract as a free agent with the Montreal Canadiens. He elected to wear number 17 with the Canadiens rather than his usual 27, which was Alex Kovalev's number at the time. One of the main reasons why Montreal sought Laraque was to add toughness; in the previous year's playoffs, they had been outplayed physically by the Philadelphia Flyers, and in the first round, they had difficulty countering Boston Bruin Milan Lucic. On November 21, 2009 Laraque was suspended 5 games after hitting Detroit Red Wings defenseman Niklas Kronwall with a knee to knee hit. On December 12, 2009, Laraque would enter his final fight taking on Eric Boulton of the Atlanta Thrashers. On January 21, 2010 the Montreal Canadiens released Laraque and announced they were planning to buy out the remainder of his contract.  His contract was officially bought out on June 15, 2010. Because Laraque had been suffering from two herniated discs in his back during the last season and a half that he had been playing, he subsequently announced his retirement from professional hockey. Laraque took advantage of being released by the Canadiens to offer his help to Haiti, his country of ancestry, and began raising money to rebuild the Grace Children's Hospital in Port-au-Prince, Haiti, in association with World Vision and the NHLPA.

While playing with the Oilers, Laraque was famous for his "Laraque Leap", in which he would smash his body against the glass at Northlands Coliseum after the Oilers scored a goal.

Laraque came out of retirement on January 16, 2015, joining Norway's Lokomotiv Fana, where he played two games before retiring again.

Additionally, he was the assistant coach of the Haiti street and ball hockey national team during the 2015 Streethockey World Championship in Zug, Switzerland.

Political career

On February 13, 2010, Laraque joined the Green Party of Canada. On July 31, 2010, Laraque was officially named one of the party's Deputy Leaders. On July 9, 2013 he announced he would run for the federal Green Party in the by-election in Bourassa. On October 17, 2013 Laraque resigned as deputy leader of the Green Party of Canada and as candidate in Bourassa riding.

Personal life
Laraque's parents were both born in Haiti and immigrated to Canada; he was born in Montreal, Quebec. During his NHL career, he was nicknamed "Big Georges", sometimes shortened to "BGL". His brother Jules-Edy Laraque played ice hockey in minor leagues, while his cousin Jean-Luc Grand-Pierre played in the NHL and various European leagues.

In the off-season, Laraque resides in Edmonton, which he considers his home away from home. On Fridays during the off-season, Laraque can often be heard hosting The Team 1260, an afternoon radio sports program in Edmonton. Laraque commits considerable time to local charity work to help the people of Edmonton, Pittsburgh, and Haiti following the 2010 earthquake.

On April 30, 2020, Laraque, who is asthmatic, was hospitalized for COVID-19 at the Hôpital Charles-LeMoyne in Longueuil, Quebec.

Business and sports events
Laraque became a vegan in 2009 to protest animal abuse by the meat industry. He is an investor in two raw vegan restaurants called Crudessence. and part-owner of the Delicieux Cafe Veg Fusion restaurant.

On May 21, 2010, Laraque squared off with world welterweight mixed martial arts (MMA) champion Georges St-Pierre for three rounds of grappling for takedowns on TSN TV show Off The Record. Laraque did not score any takedowns. The same year, Laraque appeared in Season 2 of CBC's Battle of the Blades with partner Anabelle Langlois.

In 2011, Laraque took part in the CBC's Canada Reads literary competition. He was the celebrity defender for author Angie Abdou's The Bone Cage.

Laraque appeared in the 2011 film Goon as an enforcer for the fictional Albany Patriots.

On November 8, 2011, Laraque published an autobiography entitled Georges Laraque: The Story of the NHL's Unlikeliest Tough Guy.

On July 9, 2012, Perry Boskus, president of a Florida-based company that produced synthetic ice sheets that Laraque sold in Canada, issued a press release accusing the player of fraud. One day later, Boskus retracted these allegations.

The Canadian Hockey League Players' Association named Laraque its first executive director on August 21, 2012.

On November 17, 2014, Laraque challenged Quebec women's cycling champion Lex Albrecht to a bike race up Mount Royal. Laraque required medical attention following the race, which he lost to Albrecht.

On October 15, 2016, Laraque co-founded Mentorum (www.mentorum.co), a health and fitness company, with Jason Frohlich.

On November 10, 2020, Laraque stated that a deal to fight Mike Tyson for charity was 75% done. Tyson first had a fight scheduled for November 28th 2020, against Roy Jones Jr. 

Laraque now owns a series of health and fitness related businesses, including Rise Kombucha and his own vegan restaurant in Montreal.

Transactions
 Drafted by the Oilers on July 8, 1995 (second round, #31 pick overall).
 Signed with Phoenix as a free agent on July 5, 2006.
 Traded to Pittsburgh on February 27, 2007 for Daniel Carcillo and 2008 third-round pick (#90 overall, used on Tomáš Kundrátek).
 Signed with Montreal as a free agent on July 3, 2008.
 Retired on August 2, 2010

Achievements

Awards
 Edward J. Debartolo Community Service Award – 2008

Career statistics

See also
List of Montreal athletes
List of famous Montrealers
List of black NHL players
List of Pittsburgh Penguins players

References

External links

 Georges Laraque official site

1976 births
AIK IF players
Battle of the Blades participants
Black Canadian ice hockey players
Black Canadian politicians
Canadian expatriate ice hockey players in Sweden
Canadian ice hockey right wingers
Canadian sports executives and administrators
Canadian sportsperson-politicians
Edmonton Oilers draft picks
Edmonton Oilers players
Granby Prédateurs players
Green Party of Canada politicians
Haitian Quebecers
Hamilton Bulldogs (AHL) players
Ice hockey people from Montreal
Laval Titan Collège Français players
Living people
Montreal Canadiens players
Pittsburgh Penguins players
Phoenix Coyotes players
Saint-Hyacinthe Laser players
Saint-Jean Lynx players
Sports labor leaders